Thomas James "Rusty" Richards, MC (29 April 1882 – 25 September 1935) was an Australian military officer and national representative rugby union player, who was born at Vegetable Creek, Emmaville in New South Wales. Richards is the only Australian-born player to ever represent both Australia and the British Lions and as such the Tom Richards Trophy is named in his honor. He is an inductee to the Australian Rugby Union Hall of Fame.

Early years
Richard's Cornish father emigrated to Australia during the Gold Rush from Cornwall in the United Kingdom. Nicknamed Rusty, he grew up in the gold mining town of Charters Towers in Northern Queensland. His interest in the rugby game developed when a New South Wales touring side visited his town. He started training and playing rugby, and went on to represent Queensland. His family moved to South Africa in 1905.

Rugby wanderer

He continued playing rugby in South Africa, playing a small number of games for the Transvaal in the domestic Currie Cup competition. That year the South Africa national rugby union team was preparing for its first overseas tour to Great Britain, and the Currie Cup was used as a trial to select the touring squad. Richards was initially considered as a squad member but a complicated qualifying rule prevented his inclusion. He subsequently travelled to England where he continued playing rugby in the county championships spending a season representing Bristol. Richards also played at county level whilst in Britain and was chosen to play for Gloucester in their encounter with the South Africa team he was excluded from touring with.

He soon returned to Australia and became the lynch-pin of the Queensland pack, which led to him being selected for the 'Wallabies' in the 1908 tour of the United Kingdom. He played in both Test matches of the tour and was Australia's first try-scorer in the Test against Wales. The touring party took part in the 1908 Summer Olympics that were being held in London. The team won gold with Richards again scoring a try, over a Cornish side representing Great Britain. Richards thus became an Olympic Gold medallist.

He returned to South Africa after his touring duties. In 1910 the British Isles team were touring South Africa and in July of that year played Transvaal. The tourist had picked up a number of injuries and Richards was drafted in to face his old team as he qualified to play through his membership with Bristol. He ended up representing Britain on twelve occasions including two Tests against South Africa. He scored once for Britain, a try in the second encounter with Transvaal. He returned to Australia in 1911 and was selected to tour to the United States and Canada with Australia in 1912. He played at break-away in the sole Test of that tour - the November 1912 clash against the United States at Berkeley - and scored a try in that match. In 1913 his wanderlust returned, and he spent the year travelling around Europe, playing rugby in England, France, Italy and Switzerland. While in France he signed with Toulouse as a player and manager.

War service and later life

Richards enlisted in the Australian Imperial Force (AIF) on 26 August 1914 and in October sailed for Egypt on the Transport Euripides with the 1st Field Ambulance. He was part of the landing at Gallipoli on the morning of 25 April 1915 and served as a stretcher-bearer. In July 1915 he was mentioned in divisional orders for "acts of gallantry" in May and June 1915.  With the conclusion of the Gallipoli Campaign in December 1915 he returned to Egypt and then in March 1916 left for the Western Front, when he was also appointed lance corporal. On 25 November 1916 he was commissioned second lieutenant and, in December, transferred to the 1st Infantry Battalion. In May 1917, during the Battle of Arras near Bullecourt, he led a nineteen-man bombing party. He was promoted lieutenant in June 1917 and awarded the Military Cross in August for "conspicuous gallantry and devotion to duty". In May 1917 he was accidentally injured in a bomb blast at the 1st ANZAC Training School. He was evacuated to England twice in 1917 and again in May 1918, with damage to his back and shoulders from a bomb blast. He left England in August 1918 and, after four months in South Africa en route, arrived in Sydney in February 1919 where his AIF appointment was terminated on 3 November.

Legacy and accolades
The Tom Richards Cup is the trophy that is played for between the British & Irish Lions and Australia. In 2005 he was honoured as one of the inaugural five inductees into the Australian Rugby Union Hall of Fame. Upon his induction Australian Rugby Union President Paul McLean commented: "late Tom Richards was an extraordinary character whom The Times described in 1908 as the first man to be picked for Earth if we were ever to play Mars!"

See also
 Rugby union at the 1908 Summer Olympics
 1912 Australia rugby union tour of Canada and the U.S.
 Tom Richards Cup

References

External links
 ADB biography
 Tom Richards
 
 

1882 births
1935 deaths
Australian rugby union players
Australia international rugby union players
Australian people of Cornish descent
Rugby union players at the 1908 Summer Olympics
British & Irish Lions rugby union players from Australia
Stade Toulousain players
Stade Toulousain coaches
Golden Lions players
Sportsmen from New South Wales
Olympic rugby union players of Australasia
Olympic gold medalists for Australasia
Australian military personnel of World War I
Expatriate rugby union players in France
Australian expatriate rugby union players
Expatriate rugby union players in South Africa
Australian expatriate sportspeople in France
Australian expatriate sportspeople in South Africa
Expatriate rugby union players in England
Australian expatriate sportspeople in England
Medalists at the 1908 Summer Olympics
Australian recipients of the Military Cross
Australian Army officers
Rugby union forwards
Rugby union players from New South Wales